General elections were held in the New Hebrides in July and August 1969 to elect fourteen members of the thirty members of the Advisory Council.

Background
In 1968 proposals were approved to increase the size of the Advisory Council from 26 to 30 members. The enlarged Council consisted of six 'official' members (the two Resident Commissioners, the British Assistant Commissioner, the French Chancelier, the Superintendent of Public Works and the Treasurer), ten nominated members (three British, three French and four Hebridean) and fourteen elected members, of which three would be British, three French and eight Hebridean. The six British and French representatives were elected indirectly by the Chamber of Commerce, with the Hebridean members elected by local councils and public meetings in areas where local councils did not exist.

Results

Appointed members

Aftermath
The newly elected Advisory Council met for the first time on 1 October in Port Vila.

References

New Hebrides
General
Elections in Vanuatu
Election and referendum articles with incomplete results